Ngwenya is an Nguni surname meaning "crocodile". Notable people with the surname include:

Dumisani Ngwenya (born 1984), South African footballer
Godfrey Ngwenya (born 1950), South African military commander
Gwen Ngwenya (born 1989), South African academic and politician 
Joseph Ngwenya (born 1981), Zimbabwean footballer
Lindiwe Ngwenya, Zimbabwean army officer
Malangatana Ngwenya (1936–2011), Mozambican painter and poet
Manqoba Ngwenya (born 1981), South African footballer
Sipho Ngwenya, South African politician
Takudzwa Ngwenya (born 1985), American rugby union player

Zimbabwean surnames

References